Maha Minister is an Indian Marathi language television reality series which aired on Zee Marathi. It was hosted by Aadesh Bandekar which was held in 10 cities in Maharashtra. This game show was related to Home Minister. It premiered from 11 April 2022 aired Daily and stopped on 26 June 2022 airing Grand Finale of the show completing 77 episodes.

Auditions 
 Nashik
 Thane
 Sambhajinagar
 Pune
 Solapur
 Panvel
 Ahmednagar
 Ratnagiri
 Kolhapur
 Nagpur

Finalists 
 Laxmi Dhekane (Winner)
 Rupali Pakhare
 Suvarna Pendhare
 Sharayu Patil
 Kaveri Matre
 Sapna Rangdal
 Sonali Patil
 Apeksha Pawar
 Saloni Yewalekar
 Nivedita Gurubhele

References

External links 
 Maha Minister at ZEE5
 
Marathi-language television shows
2022 Indian television series debuts
Zee Marathi original programming
2022 Indian television series endings
Indian reality television series